Brazil: Once Again is an album by jazz flautist Herbie Mann which was recorded in 1977 and released on the Atlantic label. The album marks Mann's return to the Brazilian influences that first emerged on his early 1960s albums like Right Now, Brazil, Bossa Nova & Blues, Do the Bossa Nova with Herbie Mann and Herbie Mann Live at Newport.

Reception

Allmusic awarded the album 2 stars with its review by Scott Yanow stating: "the music is listenable but somewhat forgettable".

Track listing
All compositions by Herbie Mann except as indicated
 "Pele" - 6:32
 "Oh How I Want to Love You" - 9:31
 "Dingui Li Bangui" (J. D. San, MacDonys) - 4:35
 "Lugar Comun (Common Place)" (João Donato, Gilberto Gil) - 4:45
 "O Meu Amor Chorou (Cry of Love)" (Luis Marcal Neto) - 7:36

Personnel
Herbie Mann - flute 
Pat Rebillot - keyboards, arranger
Jeff Mironov - guitar
Amaury Tristão - acoustic guitar, percussion
Tony Levin - bass
Rick Marotta  - drums
Rubens Bassini, Reggie Ferguson, Armen Halburian, Ralph MacDonald, Dom Um Romão - percussion
Alan Rubin, Lew Soloff - trumpet (track 3)
Barry Rogers, Dave Taylor - trombone (track 3)
Lew Del Gatto - baritone saxophone (track 3)

References

Herbie Mann albums
Atlantic Records albums
1978 albums